Pantydia scissa is a species of moth of the family Erebidae. It is found in Cameroon, the Democratic Republic of the Congo (Orientale, North Kivu), Kenya, Nigeria, South Africa, Uganda, Zambia and Zimbabwe.

References

Moths described in 1865
Pantydia